Dyanne DiRosario is a former American voice actress and make-up artist. She has provided voices for a number of English-language versions of Japanese anime films and television series.

Filmography

Voice Roles
 Akira - Groupie
 Perfect Blue - Yukiko
 Bastard!! - Sean Ari 
 Battle Athletes - Akari Kanzaki (OVA); Tomoe Midou (Victory)
 Carried by the Wind: Tsukikage Ran - Onami
 Fight! Iczer-1 - Sepia
 Gate Keepers - Barako Ogawa
 Code Geass - Additional voices
 .hack//Liminality - Kie
 Hyper Doll - Erika
 Legend of Black Heaven - Rinko
 Macross Plus - Lucy Macmillan
 Mobile Suit Gundam - The Movie Trilogy - Kacyllia Zabi
 Mobile Suit Gundam 0083: Stardust Memory - Paula Gullish
 Royal Space Force: The Wings of Honnêamise - Matti's Girlfriend
 The Castle of Cagliostro - Waitress

Live Action Roles
 Al TV - Crazed Fan
 On the Edge - Shawna
 Portal - VAL
 Scarecrows - Kellie

External links
 
 

Living people
American film actresses
American make-up artists
American television actresses
American voice actresses
Year of birth missing (living people)
20th-century American actresses
21st-century American actresses